Salestan (also Romanized as Sālestān; also known as Salasan and Salistan) is a village in Jirhandeh-ye Lasht-e Nesha Rural District, Lasht-e Nesha District, Rasht County, Gilan Province, Iran. At the 2006 census, its population was 208, in 64 families.

References 

Populated places in Rasht County